Selby Whittingham  (born 8 August 1941 in Batu Gajah, Malaysia) is an art expert in London who has specialized in the work of J.M.W. Turner. Whittingham is a consultant to museums and institutions. He is the secretary and founder of The Independent Turner Society and is the author of a number of books about art and museums.

Family
Whittingham was born in Batu Gajah, Malaysia. He was baptised Jeremy Selby Whittingham Oppenheim in 1941 in Malaya, but dropped the name "Oppenheim" soon after by deed poll due to anti-German feeling then. His father, Henry Rolf Oppenheim (1902–1987), escaped from Singapore in a sampan with the Australian Major-General Gordon Bennett to India, an escape which became the subject of a parliamentary question to Winston Churchill. Whittingham's uncle, Sir Duncan Oppenheim, besides his life in business, was an artist and Chairman of the Design Council and of the Royal College of Art as well as a member of the V&A Advisory Council.  His mother, Barbara Whittingham-Jones, was admitted to the bar at Gray's Inn. She was involved in politics with Randolph Churchill, and subsequently worked in journalism and as a historian, but died aged 51.  [See 2021 Wikipedia entry on mother, Barbara Whittingham-Jones]

Education
Whittingham was educated at Shrewsbury School and Oriel College, Oxford, then at University of Manchester.  After Shrewsbury he filled his semi-gap year by attending the French Civilisation Course at the Sorbonne, University of Paris, and as an assistant at the National Portrait Gallery at the invitation of the Director. At Oxford he studied Mods and Greats of Literae Humaniores (classics). He was awarded a Ph.D. at the University of Manchester for a thesis on realism in medieval portraiture.

Career and interest in Turner
It was as a young man that Selby began to take a special interest in J.M.W. Turner. His father had the same name as his ancestor, Henry Oppenheim, a neighbour of Benjamin Godfrey Windus, whose correspondence with Turner and John Ruskin Selby Whittingham discovered and published.

After Oxford, Whittingham was an assistant in the Conway Library at the Courtauld Institute of Art and then went to Manchester City Art Gallery as a trainee assistant for 2 years.  He worked as a temporary assistant at the National Portrait Gallery and was then appointed assistant keeper at Manchester City Art Gallery in 1975. The same year he rejoined the staff of Manchester City Art Gallery. He then founded the Turner Society.

Whittingham was an admirer of Ruskin and involved with the fine collections of Turner watercolours at Manchester.  Whittingham launched the proposal for a Turner Society to reunite the Turner Bequest in a separate Turner Gallery.  Henry Moore became its president, and vice-presidents included the Earl of Harewood, John Piper, Victor Pasmore etc.  Opposed were the museums (represented by Cecil Gould for the National Gallery, Andrew Wilton for the British Museum and Sir Norman Reid for the Tate). Whittingham considered that the original Turner Society had abandoned the aims for which it was founded - to reunite the whole Turner Bequest in a separate Turner Gallery -, so he created a new society, The Independent Turner Society.

Whittingham has published many studies relating to Turner's work and life. He has expressed a special interest in ensuring that the wishes that Turner expressed in his will are honoured.

Whittingham organised a Turner Symposium at the University of York in 1980 and an International Colloquium on Artists' Museums  at the University of Paris in 1990).  He was a guest curator for the Turner Museum in the United States, in 2009. He has worked closely with ArtWatch International and contributes often to the ArtWatchUK Journal and The Jackdaw.  He was awarded Art Watch's Frank Mason Prize in 2011.

Publications
Whittingham has published numerous works on J.M.W Turner.

His other publications include:

 An Historical Account of the Will of J.M.W.Turner, R.A., 5 fascicules, 415 pp., Independent Turner Society, 2nd edition, 1993–1996;
 The Fallacy of Mediocrity:  The Need for a Proper Turner Gallery, 4 fascicules, Independent Turner Society, 1992;
 English Watercolours and Drawings from the Manchester City Art Gallery, Thos. Agnew and Sons Ltd, October 1977, Catalogue by Selby Whittingham (nos 93-116 Turner watercolours);
 Of Geese, Mallards and Drakes:  Some Notes on Turner's Family, with contributions from others, Parts 1–4.  1. The Danbys, 1993, 138 pp.;The Turners of Devon, 1995, 134 pp.; Mrs Booth of Margate, 1996, 144 pp.; The Marshalls & Harpurs, 1999, 290 pp., in 2 fascicules, Independent Turner Society, 1993–1999.
 The World Directory of Artists' Museums, Lists some 500 museums, houses, monuments, libraries, including those which no longer exist, 148 pp., Independent Turner Society, 1995;
 Ruskin's Guide to the Turners in the Clore Gallery, Ed. With Robert Walmsley, Independent Turner Society;
 'Turner, Ruskin and Constable at Salisbury', The Burlington Magazine, CXIII, May 1971, pp. 272–5
 A Vision of the First Proper National 'Turner's Gallery''', Independent Turner Society, 2007;
 Ruskin as Turner's Executor, Essay and documents, 70 pp., Independent Turner Society, 1995;
 Turner Exhibited 1856–61, Critique of the Turner Bequest pictures, 1856–61'', 78 pp., Independent Turner Society, 1995;

References

An interview in The Independent, 7 Feb 1989, p. 5, with photo, by David Lister, then as now its arts editor. ("Turner devotee fights to fulfill artist's wishes").
A profile by Kenneth Hudson in the European Museum of the Year Award soon after by its founder/director Kenneth Hudson, again with photo.
Award of the Frank Mason Prize by ArtWatch in 2011.  The citation appears (again with photo) as a post on the ArtWatchUK website and will appear in its next journal.

1941 births
Living people
People educated at Shrewsbury School
Alumni of Oriel College, Oxford
Alumni of the University of Manchester
British art historians